Guy Aldonce de Durfort, duc de Lorges, Marshal of France, (1630–1702) fought in the Franco-Dutch War mostly on the Rhine under his uncle Marshal Turenne, but in 1673 he was seconded to the Siege of Maastricht. Back on the Rhine, he fought at Entzheim in 1674, at Turckheim in January 1675, and at Sasbach in July 1675, where Turenne fell. He distinguished himself at the retreat from Sasbach and the ensuing Battle of Altenheim.

In the Nine Years' War he commanded the Rhine army and took the city and the castle of Heidelberg in 1693. He is often mentioned in Saint-Simon's Mémoires as he was the author's father-in-law.

Birth and origins 
Guy Aldonce was born on 22 August 1630, at the Château de Duras, the fourth son of Guy Aldonce de Durfort (1605-1665) and Elisabeth de La Tour d'Auvergne. His father was marquis of Duras, comte de Rauzan and comte de Lorges, as well as maréchal de camp in the French army. The Durfort family held Duras since the 14th century. Guy's mother was a daughter of Henri de La Tour d'Auvergne and sister of the Marshal Turenne. Both his parents were Calvinists.

Guy was the fourth son, but his twin brother, Armand, died as an infant and he thereafter occupied the third position and was often counted as the third son. His father distributed his subsidiary titles as courtesy titles among his sons. Guy was thus, after the death of his twin brother, styled comte de Lorges and was called Lorges, sometimes spelt Lorge, notably by Saint-Simon. He was numbered "Guy Aldonce II de Durfort" in the Durfort family, whereas his father was numbered "Guy Aldonce I de Durfort".

Guy's eldest brother, Jacques Henri de Durfort de Duras, also became a Marshal of France. Their uncle Turenne probably helped to further the careers of both brothers.

Guy was one of 12 siblings:

Franco-Dutch War 
In the Franco-Dutch War (1672–1678) Lorges served mostly under Turenne in the French Rhine Army. However, in 1673 he was sent to Flanders with 7000 of Turenne's men to take part in the Siege of Maastricht. He was assigned the north-eastern sector before Wijck, the part of Maastricht that lies on the right bank of the Maas. The town, under the command of Jacques de Fariaux, surrendered on 30 June 1673.

Back on the Rhine, Lorges probably participated in the devastation of the Palatinate by Turenne in 1674. On 4 October 1674 in the Battle of Entzheim, Lorges commanded the Brigade d'Humières and the Dragons de la Reine on the left wing. On 5 January 1675 he fought at the French victory of Turckheim where he commanded the right wing. When Turenne was killed at Sasbach on 27 July 1675, Lorges was lieutenant-general of the day, but marquis de Vaubrun was the most senior lieutenant-general. They agreed to alternate the command daily between them. The army retreated from Sasbach and fought the Battle of Altenheim, where Vaubrun, who commanded the rearguard, was killed on 1 August 1675. When Lorges arrived back in Alsace he was ordered to hand over the command of the Rhine army to his brother the Duke of Duras, who had come from the Franche-Comté for that purpose while waiting for the arrival of Condé from Flanders whom Louis XIV had appointed as commander of the Rhine Army. On 26 January 1679 France made peace with the Holy Roman Empire in the Treaties of Nijmegen ending the Franco-Dutch War.

Marriage and children 
On 19 March 1676 (date of the contract) Lorges married Geneviève de Frémont, daughter of the keeper of the King's jewels. Many of his friends considered that he had married socially beneath him, but the marriage was a happy one and even his son-in-law Saint-Simon, who disapproved of marriage between the classes, admitted that she was an admirable wife.

 
Guy Aldonce and Geneviève had one son and four daughters:
Marie Gabrielle (1678–1743), married Louis de Rouvroy, duc de Saint-Simon;
Geneviève (1680-1740), called "Mademoiselle de Quintin", who married Antoine Nompar de Caumont, duke of Lauzun;
Guy Nicolas (1683–1758), succeeded him as duc de Lorges;

Saint-Simon praised Lorges, his father-in-law, warmly in his Memoirs, describing him as highly principled, frank, upright, good-natured, sincere and the most truthful man alive. Lorges supplied his son-in-law with useful material for his memoirs, particularly on the early relations between Louis XIV and Madame de Maintenon.

Nine Years' War 
During the Nine Years' War (1688–1697), also called the War of the Grand Alliance, Lorges commanded the French army of the Rhine from 1690 to 1695. On 31 December 1688 in the Chapel of the Château de Versailles he was made a Knight of the Order of the Holy Spirit.

In 1691 Lorges was elevated by Louis XIV to duc de Quintin-Lorge.

On 27 September 1692, he surprised and routed 4,000 imperial cavalry under the command of Frederick Charles of Württemberg-Winnental in their camp at Ötisheim and took Württemberg prisoner.

On 22 May 1693 Lorges took the city of Heidelberg, then the capital of the Electoral Palatinate. The castle capitulated the next day. Johann Wilhelm, Elector Palatine, was also Duke of Jülich and Berg and resided at Düsseldorf. Heidelberg been burned by René de Froulay de Tessé in 1689 and the castle's Fat Tower had been blown up. Lorges now completed the destruction by burning the town and castle again. The commander des Bordes blew up many of the fortifications, notably the castle's Powder Tower, now known as the "Gesprengte Turm" (Blown-up Tower).

The campaign of 1694 was relatively uneventful for the Rhine Army. On 20 June 1695, Lorges fell ill and was temporarily replaced by Joyeuse as commander of the Rhine Army. Lorges's wife came from Paris and took him to Vichy so that he should take thermal baths there for his health. On 4 September Lorges returned to his post. In 1696 he was ill again and Marshal Choiseul was appointed in his place. On 30 October 1697 the Emperor signed the Peace of Ryswick ending the Nine Years' War.

Death and timeline 
On 22 October 1702 he died in Paris of a botched kidney-stone surgery; Guy died in agonising pain, which he endured with great courage. He was succeeded by his son , who would marry firstly Geneviève Chamillart (1685-1714) and then secondly in 1720 Marie Anne Antoinette de Mesmes (1696–1757), eldest daughter of Jean-Antoine de Mesmes, the premier président of the Parlement of Paris.

Notes and references

Notes

Citations

Sources 

  – Dukes (for Durfort)
  – Knights of the Order of the Holy Spirit and general index
  – D to F (for Feversham)
  – 1675 to 1676
 
 
  – DOU to FEV (for Durfort)
 
 
 
  – 1691 to 1709
  – 1643 to 1681 (for the Siege of Maastricht)
  – 1681 to 1693
  – 1694 to 1702
  – 1691 to 1693
  – 1694 to 1695

1630 births
1702 deaths
Converts to Roman Catholicism from Calvinism
Dukes of Lorges
French military personnel of the Nine Years' War
French military personnel of the Franco-Dutch War
Marshals of France